Rodrigo Eduardo da Silva (born 24 July 1995), known as Rodrigo Sam, is a Brazilian professional footballer who plays as centre back for Marcílio Dias.

Career
In 2010, Rodrigo joined a project based in his hometown to discover young talents called Stadium BR. The club is a company that focus only on youth squads. He nearly moved to PTSC in Londrina, before signing with Marília in 2012. Rodrigo made his professional debut for Marília at the Campeonato Paulista A2 in 2014, being an important part in the Marília team that gained the access to division A1 of the same tournament. After the tournament ended, he signed with Corinthians, but was moved directly to their youth squad. He won the 2014 U20 Campeonato Paulista, 2014 U20 Campeonato Brasileiro and the 2015 Copa São Paulo de Futebol Júnior. He was promoted to Corinthians main squad in February 2015, right after the end of Copa São Paulo de Futebol Júnior.

Rodrigo was part of the main squad for the 2015 Campeonato Paulista and 2015 Copa Libertadores. He made his debut for Corinthians in an away match against XV de Piracicaba at the first stage of the 2015 Campeonato Paulista.

Statistics

Honours
Corinthians
Campeonato Brasileiro Série A: 2015

References

External links

1995 births
Living people
Brazilian footballers
Association football defenders
Campeonato Brasileiro Série B players
Marília Atlético Clube players
Sport Club Corinthians Paulista players
Clube Atlético Bragantino players
Oeste Futebol Clube players
Ituano FC players
Boa Esporte Clube players
Grêmio Novorizontino players
Esporte Clube Água Santa players
Nacional Atlético Clube (SP) players
Clube Náutico Marcílio Dias players